HSwMS Klas Uggla may refer to two ships of the Swedish Navy:

, a torpedo cruiser in service 1900–17
, a destroyer in service 1932–41

Swedish Navy ship names